Christian nationalism is Christianity-affiliated religious nationalism. Christian nationalists primarily focus on internal politics, such as passing laws that reflect their view of Christianity and its role in political and social life. In countries with a state Church, Christian nationalists, in seeking to preserve the status of a Christian state, uphold an antidisestablishmentarian position.

Christian nationalists support the presence of Christian symbols and statuary in the public square, as well as state patronage for the display of religion, such as school prayer and the exhibition of nativity scenes during Christmastide or the Christian Cross on Good Friday.

Christian nationalists draw support from the broader Christian right.

By country

Austria 
The Austrofascist Fatherland Front in Austria led by Austrian Catholic Chancellors Engelbert Dollfuss and Kurt Schuschnigg.

Belgium 
The Rexist Party in Belgium was led by Léon Degrelle, a Belgian Catholic and an SS-Standartenführer.

Canada 
The COVID-19 pandemic saw a rise in Christian nationalist activity with many groups using anti-lockdown sentiments to expand their reach to more people. The group Liberty Coalition Canada has garnered support from many elected politicians across Canada. In their founding documents they argue that "it is only in Christianized nations that religious freedom has ever flourished." This group has garnered support from various groups, including supporters of far-right hate groups. Their rallies have attracted supporters of Alex Jones and Canada First, a spin-off of Nick Fuentes' group America First. Many of Liberty Coalition Canada's leaders are pastors that have racked up millions in potential fines for violating COVID protocols and some of them express ultra-conservative views.

Croatia 
The Ustaše movement was led by Ante Pavelić, the Poglavnik and Prime Minister of the Independent State of Croatia and it was supported by the Croatian Catholic Church.

Finland 
The Lapua Movement and the Patriotic People's Movement (IKL) in Finland led by the Lutherans (körtti) Vihtori Kosola and Vilho Annala respectively. Pastor Elias Simojoki led the IKL's youth organization the Blue-and-Blacks. According to docent André Swanström, Finnish Waffen SS recruits were motivated by Christian nationalism, and overwhelming amount of them devoutly adhered to the Finnish awakening movement, Laestadianism and traditional Lutheranism. Consequently, most of the SS recruits were members of the IKL. Current Blue-and-Black Movement and Power Belongs to the People are far-right Christian nationalist parties active in Finland. The latter is connected to Russian neo-Nazi and Christian fundamentalist Russian Imperial Movement.

Germany 

Karl Lueger's antisemitic Christian Social Party is sometimes viewed as a model for Adolf Hitler's Nazism. Hitler praised Lueger in his book Mein Kampf as an inspiration. In 1943, Nazi Germany produced the biographical film Vienna 1910 about Lueger, which was given the predicate "special political value".

The German Christians of the Nazi Party in Nazi Germany led by Ludwig Müller. Their movement was sustained and encouraged by factors such as:
 the 400th anniversary (in 1917) of Martin Luther's publication of the Ninety-five Theses in 1517, an event which endorsed German nationalism, stoked hostility toward foreign peoples, granted Germany a preferred place in the Protestant tradition, and legitimized antisemitism;
 the antisemitic writings of Martin Luther; cf. On the Jews and Their Lies;
 the Luther Renaissance Movement of Professor Emmanuel Hirsch; supported by publications by Guida Diehl, the first speaker of the National Socialist Women's League;
 the revival of völkisch traditions;
 the de-emphasis of the Old Testament in Lutheran theology, and the partial or total removal of Jewishness from the Bible; 
 the respect for temporal (secular) authority, which had been emphasized by Luther. The movement used scriptural support (Romans 13) to justify this position.

Greece 
Metaxism and the 4th of August Regime in Greece which was led by Ioannis Metaxas and heavily supported the Greek Orthodox Church.

Hungary 
According to researcher Moshe Herczl, "Two central ideas guided the Arrow Cross Party: Uncompromising antisemitism and Christian piety". Catholic priest Zoltan Nyisztor proposed to Cardinal Seredi that "the Catholic movements cooperate with Szálasi's party and the Catholic church support Szalasi". Archbishop József Grősz subsequently met with Szálasi in his palace.
András Kun, O.F.M. was a Roman Catholic priest of the Franciscan Order who commanded the anti-Jewish death squad for the Arrow Cross Party.

Poland 
The National Radical Camp in Poland led by Boleslaw Piasecki, Henryk Rossman, Tadeusz Gluzinski and Jan Mosdorf which heavily incorporated Polish Catholicism into its ideology especially the Falangist faction.

Romania 
The National-Christian Defense League/Iron Guard of Romania, which was led by the devoutly Romanian Orthodox Corneliu Zelea Codreanu.

Russia 
President of Russia Vladimir Putin has been described as a global leader of the Christian nationalist and Christian right movements. As President, Putin has increased the power of the Russian Orthodox Church and proclaimed his staunch belief in Eastern Orthodoxy, as well as maintaining close contacts with Patriarchs of Moscow and all Rus' Alexy II and Kirill.

The Russian Imperial Movement is a prominent neo-Nazi Christian nationalist group that trains militants all over Europe and has recruited thousands of fighters for its paramilitary group, the Imperial Legion, which is participating in the war on Ukraine. The group also works with the Atomwaffen Division in order to network with and recruit extremists from the United States.

Scotland 
In Scotland UK, the Scottish Family Party has been described as Christian nationalist. The party was formed as a push back movement, based on a rejection of LGBT+ topics being taught in schools, with the political party claiming it to be an overly sexualized topic and ideology. They believe it to be an attack on traditional Christian family values, promoted by the current Scottish government.

Serbia 
Serbian Action is an ultranationalist and Christian nationalist movement, active in Serbia since 2010. They are known for glorification of Milan Nedić, the leader of the Serbian puppet government during World War II, who
collaborated with the Germans and was responsible for persecution of Jews and Serbian communists during war. In February 2018, members of Serbian Action were among the far-right activists protesting in Belgrade in memory of Nedić, whose descendants are calling for rehabilitation. Ideals of Serbian Action are largely based on teachings of saint Nikolaj Velimirović and Serbian politician Dimitrije Ljotić, leader of pro-Italian and pro-Nazi fascist movement Yugoslav National Movement.

Slovakia 

The Slovak People's Party (Ľudaks) in Slovakia led by President Jozef Tiso, a Catholic priest.

Slovenia 
The Black Hand (Slovene: Črna roka) was a Christian clerical fascist terrorist organization active in the Slovene Lands during World War II. It conducted assassinations of members of the Liberation Front of the Slovene Nation and Slovene Partisans. The organization's main goal was the elimination of "communism and its proponents". It is often regarded as associated with the Catholic Church and Slovene Home Guard.

Members were often young and pious men from a rural background who likely joined the group due to the influence of local religious authorities. Members were often also associated with the Slovene Home Guard, Chetniks, and clerical groups. Black Hand justified its actions as a defense of traditional faith and religion.

During Italian occupation, Slovenian Catholic priests actively participated in the Legion of death (Slovene: Legija smrti) within the MVAC (Anti-Communist Volunteer Militia). Bishop Roţman took part in the Home Guard swearing of oath to Adolf Hitler and performed a mass before the event.

Spain 
The FET y de las JONS of Spain led by Spanish Catholic Francisco Franco, which developed into National Catholicism.

Turkey 
The Autocephalous Turkish Orthodox Patriarchate was established by nationalist cleric Papa Eftim I. Its predecessor, the General Congregation of the Anatolian Turkish Orthodox, were also pro-Turkish nationalist. Their followers had a conflict with the Greek Orthodox Church and they identified as Turkish rather than Greek. They were also supporters of Mustafa Kemal Atatürk.

United States 

Before the Second World War, a prominent Christian nationalist organization was the Silver Legion of America which was led by William Dudley Pelley and combined American Christianity (specifically Protestantism) with American white nationalism.

The Christian Liberty Party and the American Redoubt movement ― both organized and inspired by members of the Constitution Party ― are early 21st century examples of political tendencies which are rooted in Christian separatism and the promotion of the United States as an explicitly white Christian nation. Christian nationalists believe that the US is meant to be a Christian nation and want to "take back" the US for God. Author Bradley Onishi has described this theologically-infused political ideology as a "national renewal project that envisions a pure American body that is heterosexual, white, native-born, that speaks English as a first language, and that is thoroughly patriarchal."

Experts say that Christian-associated support for right-wing politicians and social policies, such as legislation which is related to immigration, gun control and poverty is best understood as Christian nationalism, rather than evangelicalism per se. Some studies of white evangelicals show that, among people who self-identify as evangelical Christians, the more they attend church, the more they pray, and the more they read the Bible, the less support they have for nationalist (though not socially conservative) policies. Non-nationalistic evangelicals ideologically agree with Christian nationalists in areas such as patriarchal policies, gender roles, and sexuality.

A study which was conducted in May 2022 showed that the strongest base of support for Christian nationalism comes from Republicans who identify as Evangelical or born again Christians. Of this demographic group, 78% are in favor of formally declaring that the United States should be a Christian nation, versus only 48% of Republicans overall. Age is also a factor, with over 70% of Republicans from the Baby Boomer and Silent Generations supporting the United States officially becoming a Christian nation. According to Politico, the polling also found that sentiments of white grievance are highly correlated with Christian nationalism: "White respondents who say that members of their race have faced more discrimination than others are most likely to embrace a Christian America. Roughly 59% of all Americans who say white people have been discriminated against ... favor declaring the U.S. a Christian nation, compared to 38% of all Americans."

Congresswoman Marjorie Taylor Greene has referred to herself as a Christian nationalist. Fellow congresswomen Lauren Boebert and Mary Miller have also expressed support for Christian nationalism. Politician Doug Mastriano is a prominent figure in the fundamentalist Christian nationalist movement, and has called the separation of church and state a myth.

Andrew Torba, the CEO of the alt-tech platform Gab, supported Mastriano's failed 2022 bid for office, in order to build a grass-roots Christian nationalist political movement to help "take back" government power for "the glory of God"; he has argued that "unapologetic Christian Nationalism is what will save the United States of America". Torba is also a proponent of the great replacement conspiracy theory, and he has said that "The best way to stop White genocide and White replacement, both of which are demonstrably and undeniably happening, is to get married to a White woman and have a lot of White babies". White nationalist Nick Fuentes has also expressed support for Christian nationalism.

Author Katherine Stewart has called the combined ideology and political movement of Christian nationalism "an organized quest for power" and she says that Florida governor Ron DeSantis has identified with and promoted this system of values in order to gain votes in his bid for political advancement. Desantis, who has invoked Christian nationalist rhetoric, has also endorsed the Evangelical Christian notion of "purity culture" and the mythology of "white innocence" while pushing laws such as the Stop W.O.K.E. act to combat so-called "woke indoctrination" in schools. According to the Tampa Bay Times, DeSantis has also promoted a civics course for educators, which emphasized the belief that "the nation's founders did not desire a strict separation of state and church"; the teacher training program also "pushed a judicial theory, favored by legal conservatives like DeSantis, that requires people to interpret the Constitution as the framers intended it, not as a living, evolving document". 

Some Christian nationalists also engage in spiritual warfare and they say militarized forms of prayers in order to defend and advance their beliefs and political agenda. According to American Studies professor S. Jonathon O'Donnell: "A key idea in spiritual warfare is that demons don't only attack people, as in depictions of demonic possession, but also take control of places and institutions, such as journalism, academia, and both municipal and federal bureaucracies. By doing so, demons are framed as advancing social projects that spiritual warriors see as opposing God's plans. These include advances in reproductive and LGBTQ rights and tolerance for non-Christian religions (especially Islam)."

January 6 and beyond 
In the wake of the January 6 attack on the Capitol, the term "Christian nationalism" has become synonymous with white Christian identity politics, a belief system that asserts itself as an integral part of American identity overall. The New York Times notes that historically, "Christian nationalism in America has ... encompassed extremist ideologies". Critics have argued that Christian nationalism promotes racist tendencies, male violence, anti-democratic sentiment, and revisionist history. Christian nationalism in the United States is also linked to political opposition to gun control laws and strong cultural support for the Second Amendment which protects the right to keep and bear arms.

Political analyst Jared Yates Sexton has said: "Republicans recognize that QAnon and Christian nationalism are invaluable tools" and that these belief systems "legitimize antidemocratic actions, political violence, and widespread oppression", which he calls an "incredible threat" that extends beyond Trumpism.

Criticisms of significance 
Responding to media analysis about the effects of Christian Trumpism and Christian nationalism following the 2020 presidential election, Professor Daniel Strand, writing for The American Conservative, said that there was a "superficially Christian presence at the January 6 protest" and he criticized claims that Christian nationalism played a central role in the attack on the Capitol. He cited a University of Chicago study which found that "those arrested on January 6 were motivated by the belief that the election was stolen and [influenced by] what they call 'the great replacement' " theory. Strand says the study failed to mention "any explicit religious motivation, let alone theological beliefs about America being a Christian nation".

Yugoslavia 
The fascist Yugoslav National Movement (1935–45) has been described as a Christian nationalist movement.

See also 

 Alt-right
 Antisemitism in Christianity
 Christian Defense League
 Christian democracy
 Christian fascism
 Christian Front (United States)
 Christian fundamentalism
 Christian Identity
 Christianity and violence
 Christian Nationalist Crusade
 Christian reconstructionism
 Christian right
 Christian state
 Christian terrorism
 Christian theology
 Christian Zionism
 Clerical fascism
 Dominion theology
 Evangelical deconstruction
 Exvangelical
 Hindutva
 History of Christian thought on persecution and tolerance
 Kinism
 Muscular Christianity
 National church
 Pan-Islamism
 Philippine Independent Church
 Racial views of Donald Trump
 Religious terrorism
 Right-wing terrorism
 Role of Christianity in civilization
 Seven Mountain Mandate
 Theocracy
 Theonomy
 The Trump Prophecy
 Zionism

References

Further reading 
 
 
 
 
 
 
 
 Shortle, Allyson F.; McDaniel, Eric L.; Nooruddin, Irfan. 2022.The Everyday Crusade: Christian Nationalism in American Politics. Cambridge University Press

External links 
 Christian Nationalists of America
 
 Minnesota lawmakers' 'Secular Government Caucus' will combat Christian nationalism

Christian nationalism
Christianity and political ideologies
Conservatism
Conservatism in the United States
Dominion theology
Far-right politics
Religious nationalism
Antisemitism
Christianity and politics
Anti-LGBT sentiment
Anti-abortion movement
Alt-right